The Eremomycetaceae are a family of fungi with an uncertain taxonomic placement in the class Dothideomycetes.

References

Dothideomycetes enigmatic taxa
Dothideomycetes families